Jungle Stories was an American pulp magazine published from 1938 to 1954.  The lead stories featured the adventures of Ki-Gor, the son of a Scottish missionary raised in the jungle like Tarzan.  For the first two years, the novels formed a continuous narrative, including Ki-Gor meeting Helene Vaughan, a pilot who crashes in the jungle and is saved by Ki-Gor; they later marry.  After 1940, the novels were unconnected episodes featuring both of them fighting perils that included some science fictional tropes such as talking gorillas and dinosaurs.  The first novel was written by John M. Reynolds; all the later novels were listed under the house name "John Peter Drummond".  Some of these were written by Stanley Mullen, but the authors of the others are unknown.  Short stories appeared alongside the lead novel in each issue, from authors including Wilbur S. Peacock, Duane Rimel, Dan Cushman, Bryce Walton, and E. Hoffman Price.

Bibliographic details 
Jungle Stories was published by Fiction House, and produced 59 issues between Winter 1938 and Spring 1954. It was pulp format and 128 pages for all issues. The price began at 20 cents, rising to 25 cents with the Winter 1950 issue. There were four volumes of 12 numbers and a final volume with 11 numbers.  It was initially quarterly, though there was no Spring 1939 issue, and there were two issues, dated February and April 1943, instead of a Spring 1943 issue.  From 1951 to the end there was no Summer issue each year.

References

Sources 

 

Magazines established in 1938
Magazines disestablished in 1954
Pulp magazines